Head Rajkan (also Rajkan Head) is a town and union council of Yazman Tehsil, Bahawalpur District, Punjab. Its population is 70,000 according to census 1998.

Populated places in Bahawalpur District